Francesco Bombagi (born 7 September 1989) is an Italian professional footballer who plays as a midfielder for  club Catanzaro.

Career
He made his Serie B debut for Pisa on 14 November 2008 in a game against Mantova.

On 23 August 2019, he signed a two-year contract with Teramo.

On 7 July 2021, he signed a two-year contract with Catanzaro.

Honours
Pordenone
 Serie C: 2018–19 (Group B)
 Supercoppa di Serie C: 2019

References

External links
 
 

1989 births
Living people
People from Sassari
Footballers from Sardinia
Italian footballers
Association football midfielders
Serie B players
Serie C players
Lega Pro Seconda Divisione players
Pisa S.C. players
A.C. Mezzocorona players
S.S. Villacidrese Calcio players
Reggina 1914 players
Piacenza Calcio 1919 players
F.C. Grosseto S.S.D. players
S.S. Juve Stabia players
Catania S.S.D. players
S.S. Racing Club Fondi players
Ternana Calcio players
Pordenone Calcio players
S.S. Teramo Calcio players
U.S. Catanzaro 1929 players